Rosevear's serotine (Pseudoromicia roseveari) is a species of vesper bat that lives in Guinea and Liberia. It was described as a new species in 2013. It is listed as endangered by the IUCN.

Taxonomy and etymology
It was described in 2013. Its closest relative is the dark-brown serotine, Pseudoromicia brunnea. Rosevear's serotine and the dark-brown serotine are separated by a genetic distance of 6.9–7.2%. The new species was assigned to the genus Neoromicia based on its single upper premolar: a trait shared amongst all species in the genus. The authors who described the species chose the specific epithet "roseveari" to honor Donovan Reginald Rosevear, "who made a significant contribution to West African bat research in the 20th century, culminating in his book The Bats of West Africa".

Although initially described in the genus Neoromicia, a 2020 study found it to belong to a separate genus, described as Pseudoromicia.

Description
Despite this small size, it is the largest "pipistrelloid" (bats in the genera Afronycteris, Pseudoromicia, Laephotis, Hypsugo, Neoromicia, and Pipistrellus) in West Africa. In some aspects, Eisentraut's serotine overlaps with Rosevear's serotine in size, though they can be differentiated by their morphology. Its fur is dark chocolate brown in color. The fur on its ventral surface is bicolored, with the bases of individual hairs darker than their tips. The fur on its dorsal surface is a constant color throughout, in contrast to the bicolored ventral fur. Its ear is relatively short, and rounded at the tip. The outer edge of the tragus is curved; the base of the tragus has a "distinct lobe." Relative to other species in its genus, it has a robust skull and a broad snout.

Biology
As only six individuals have ever been encountered, very little is known about the biology of this species. A female captured in Guinea in early March 2008 was pregnant, however, with a fetus  from crown to rump.

Range and habitat
Only six specimens have ever been documented. Four specimens were recorded on the Liberian border of Mount Nimba and the other two specimens were in the Simandou Range of Guinea. All captured individuals were netted over small streams in primary rainforest.

Conservation
It is currently evaluated as endangered by the IUCN. Major threats to this species include deforestation via slash-and-burn agriculture, logging, and mining.

References

External links
A photograph of the holotype of this species

Pseudoromicia
Bats of Africa